Nizhnekumsky is a rural locality (a khutor) in Shebalinovskoye Rural Settlement, Oktyabrsky District, Volgograd Oblast, Russia. The population was 217 as of 2010. There are 4 streets.

Geography 
Nizhnekumsky is located in steppe, on Yergeni, on the left bank of the Myshkova River, 39 km northwest of Oktyabrsky (the district's administrative centre) by road. Chernomorovsky is the nearest rural locality.

References 

Rural localities in Oktyabrsky District, Volgograd Oblast